Naylor is an unincorporated community and census-designated place in Lowndes County, Georgia, United States.

Naylor was first listed as a CDP in the 2020 census with a population of 139.

History
The community was named after Captain Naylor, a railroad agent. The Georgia General Assembly incorporated Naylor as a town in 1906.

Geography
Naylor is a circular area, one mile in diameter, located at the intersection of U.S. Route 84 and Georgia State Route 135. It is located approximately 9.5 miles east of Valdosta.

 U.S. Route 84
 Georgia State Route 135

Demographics

2020 census

Note: the US Census treats Hispanic/Latino as an ethnic category. This table excludes Latinos from the racial categories and assigns them to a separate category. Hispanics/Latinos can be of any race.

References

Former municipalities in Georgia (U.S. state)
Census-designated places in Lowndes County, Georgia